H. lutea may refer to:

 Halichondria lutea, a marine demosponge
 Haliclona lutea, a marine demosponge
 Hamodes lutea, an owlet moth
 Hapsifera lutea, a fungus moth
 Helicina lutea, a land snail
 Hyperythra lutea, a geometer moth
 Hypocrea lutea, a fungus that grows on rotten wood